João Carlos Silva Faria (born 12 July 1990) is a Portuguese professional footballer who plays for Varzim S.C. as a centre-back.

He played 47 games in Portugal's second tier for Benfica B, Famalicão and Trofense, but spent most of his career at a lower level, winning the third division with Varzim in 2012 and Trofense in 2021.

Club career
Born in Barcelos, Faria spent his first three years as a senior in the third division, with G.D. Ribeirão (two seasons) and Varzim SC. In the summer of 2012 he signed with S.L. Benfica, being assigned to the reserve team in the Segunda Liga.

Faria made his debut as a professional on 26 August 2012, appearing in a 2–1 away loss against Associação Naval 1º de Maio. On 28 January of the following year he moved to Spain, agreeing to a three-and-a-half-year contract with Segunda División B club UD Salamanca.

Having played only three games in Spain, Faria returned to Portugal in the summer of 2013 to play in the third tier with Ribeirão, Vilaverdense F.C. and Merelinense FC. In June 2017 he stepped back up to division two on a two-year deal at F.C. Famalicão. He scored his one goal at the level on 25 November, opening a 6–0 home win over Sporting CP B.

After two years with F.C. Vizela, Faria joined fellow third-tier side C.D. Trofense on 17 May 2020. He won the league title in his first season, and scored the equaliser on 23 August 2021 as they came from behind to defeat F.C. Penafiel 2–1 at home near the start of the new campaign.

On 31 January 2022, Faria signed for U.D. Oliveirense of Liga 3. The season ended in promotion, despite a penalty shootout loss to S.C.U. Torreense in the final.

Faria remained in the third division, returning to Varzim after a decade away on 22 June 2022. On 16 October, at his hometown's Estádio Cidade de Barcelos, he scored the only goal of a victory over Sporting CP in the third round of the Taça de Portugal.

International career
Faria earned six caps for Portugal at under-20 and under-21 level, all in friendly matches on home soil. The first was on 28 January 2010 in a 2–2 draw with China in Óbidos, and the last was on 25 March 2011 in a 2–0 win against the Republic of Ireland.

References

External links

1990 births
Living people
People from Barcelos, Portugal
Sportspeople from Braga District
Portuguese footballers
Association football defenders
Liga Portugal 2 players
Segunda Divisão players
Gil Vicente F.C. players
G.D. Ribeirão players
Varzim S.C. players
S.L. Benfica B players
Vilaverdense F.C. players
Merelinense F.C. players
F.C. Famalicão players
F.C. Vizela players
C.D. Trofense players
U.D. Oliveirense players
Segunda División B players
UD Salamanca players
Portugal youth international footballers
Portugal under-21 international footballers
Portuguese expatriate footballers
Expatriate footballers in Spain
Portuguese expatriate sportspeople in Spain